Rolandas Verkys (born 17 March 1966) is a retired Lithuanian high jumper, who won four national titles for Lithuania in the men's high jump event.

He finished seventh at the 1992 European Indoor Championships in Genoa with a jump of 2,26 metres.

His personal best jump was 2.34 metres, achieved in June 1991 in Warszawa. This is the current Lithuanian record. The result ranked him third among European high jumpers that season, behind Dalton Grant and Sorin Matei.

References

1966 births
Living people
Lithuanian male high jumpers